Lagunas de Ruidera Natural Park is a natural park in Spain, containing 15 small lagoons, the Lagunas de Ruidera, that are located in the La Mancha plain.

The entire system runs through the valley of the Upper Guadiana River, once considered the headwaters of the Guadiana, the fourth-longest in the Iberian peninsula. The Upper Guadiana is one of many tributaries of the Guadiana.

The park area includes: the castle of Peñarroya; the ruins of the castle of Rochafrida; the Cueva de Montesinos where a passage in the Miguel de Cervantes novel Don Quixote has the eponymous hero spend a night; and the house of the King in the village of Ruidera.

Cervantes roamed this district as a tithe proctor for the Knights of St John at Argamasilla. In his novel, Don Quixote learns that the inhabitants of the Cueva de MontesinosGuadiana and Ruidera, together with their seven daughters and two nieceshave been transformed into a river and string of "lakes" by Merlin the magician.

UNESCO has included the natural park within the biosphere reserve Mancha Húmeda.  The natural park acts as a buffer zone to the core area of the biosphere reserve, the Tablas de Daimiel.

References

External links

 Blog dedicated to Lagunas de Ruidera

Natural parks of Spain
Protected areas of Castilla–La Mancha
Ramsar sites in Spain